Aleksei Aleksandrovich Bobrov (born 27 March 1972) is a former Russian professional footballer.

Club career
He made his professional debut in the Soviet Second League B in 1990 for PFC CSKA-2 Moscow.

Honours
 Russian Cup finalist: 1994.

References

1972 births
Footballers from Moscow
Living people
Soviet footballers
Russian footballers
Association football forwards
PFC CSKA Moscow players
FC Lada-Tolyatti players
FC Rostov players
FC Shinnik Yaroslavl players
FC KAMAZ Naberezhnye Chelny players
FC Mordovia Saransk players
FC Luch Vladivostok players
Russian Premier League players